Manx Wildlife Trust (MWT) was founded on 6 March 1973 and is the Isle of Man’s leading nature conservation charity.

Nature Reserves
The Manx Wildlife Trust (as of September 2022) manages 26 nature reserves, along with the Calf of Man (on behalf of Manx National Trust). These reserves total , or 0.67% of the Isle of Man and include:

Aust, acquired 2016, 
Ballachrink part of the Renscault & Ballachrink Bird Sanctuary, acquired 2011, 
Ballachurry, acquired 2016, 
Ballamoar Meadow, acquired 1994, 
Barnell Reservoir, part of the Ballamoar Bird Sanctuary, acquired 1974 & 1984, 
Breagle Glen and Cronk Aash, acquired 1988, 1991 & 2010, 
Calf of Man, owned by Manx National Trust, managed by Manx Wildlife Trust since 2005, 
Close-e-Quayle, acquired 1994 & 2003, 
Close Sartfield, acquired 1987, part of the Ballaugh Curraghs ASSI and Ramsar Site
Close Umpson, acquired 1995, part of the Ballaugh Curraghs ASSI and Ramsar Site
Cooildarry, acquired 1976 & 1979, 
Cronk-y-Bing ASSI, acquired 1989, 
Curragh Feeagh, acquired 1986, 
Curragh Kionedroghad (Onchan Wetlands), acquired 1988 & 1990, 
Dalby Mountain Moorland, acquired 1995, 
Dalby Mountain Fields, acquired 1995, 
Dobbie's Meadow, acquired 2013, 
Earystane, acquired 1998, 
Fell's Field, acquired 1998, 
Glen Dhoo, acquired 1995, 
Goshen, acquired 1995, 1998 & 2008, part of Ballaugh Curraghs ASSI Ramsar Site
Hairpin Woodland Park, acquired 2019 & 2022, 
Lough Cranstal, acquired 1989 & 2022, 
Lough Gat-e-Whing, acquired 2016, 
Miss Gyler's Meadow, acquired 1989, 
Moaney & Crawyn's Meadows, acquired 1995, part of the Ballaugh Curraghs ASSI and Ramsar Site
Mullen-e-Cloie, acquired 2008,

Nature Discovery Centres

The Manx Wildlife Trust also operate seasonal "Nature Discovery Centres" at both the Ayres National Nature Reserve and Scarlett, along with one co-located with their shop beneath the Manx Wildlife Trust offices.

References

Wildlife Trusts of the United Kingdom
Organisations based in the Isle of Man
Environment of the Isle of Man
Geography of the Isle of Man